The effects of Hurricane Georges in Mississippi included $676.8 million in damages but no fatalities.  Hurricane Georges was a Category 2 storm at landfall in Mississippi during the 1998 Hurricane season.

Background

Hurricane Georges began as a tropical wave off the coast of Africa in mid-September, 1998. Tracking towards the west, the wave spawned an area of low pressure two days later which quickly strengthened into a tropical depression. On September 16, the depression was upgraded to Tropical Storm Georges and further to Hurricane Georges the next day.

Over the following five days, the hurricane tracked through the Greater Antilles, causing over 600 fatalities, mainly in the Dominican Republic and Haiti. By September 25, Georges entered the Gulf of Mexico as a Category 2 hurricane. Shortly after landfall, the hurricane significantly slowed with forward motion reducing to a general drift towards the east. Georges dissipated on October 1 near the Atlantic coast of Florida.

Preparations
Upon entering the Gulf of Mexico on September 25, a hurricane watch was issued for the entire coastline of Mississippi. The following day, the watch was upgraded to a hurricane warning as Georges neared the Gulf Coast. On September 28, the hurricane warning was lowered to a tropical storm warning. All watches and warnings were discontinued on September 29 as Georges weakened to a tropical depression. Many citizens in southern Mississippi were told to leave due to a mandatory or recommended evacuation. Of those in the evacuation area, 60% actually left. Most of those who stayed remained because they believed their house was safe enough for the storm. Of those who left, most went to a relative's house in their own county.

Impact

The overflown rivers in the southern portion of the state flooded homes and forced more to evacuate just days after the hurricane came through. In addition, squall lines spawned multiple tornadoes, damaging evacuation shelters in Pascagoula and Gautier.

Beach erosion occurred along the coastline, resulting in some property damage on beach houses. Around Biloxi, coastal casinos and the shipyards experienced little from the storm. Inland, high winds and flooding caused extensive damage to homes. Georges's winds downed power lines, leaving 230,000 without power after the storm. After the storm, over 6,800 people stayed in 49 different shelters. One shelter in Forrest County was damaged, forcing the citizens to another camp. The shelters experienced roof damage and severe power outages, though one problem that could not be overcome was the language barrier with immigrants. Overall, Hurricane Georges caused $676.8 million (1998 USD, $894.5 million 2009 USD) in damage, though no deaths due to well-executed evacuations.

Aftermath
Including relief funds to Puerto Rico and Louisiana, a total of $14,150,532 in paid losses was reported by FEMA.

See also

Hurricane Georges
Effects of Hurricane Georges in Florida
1998 Atlantic hurricane season

References

External links
 NHC Georges Report

Hurricane Georges
1998 in Mississippi
Hurricanes in Mississippi
1998 Atlantic hurricane season
Georges